Jamie Field (born 12 December 1976) is an English former professional rugby league footballer who played for the Leeds Rhinos, the Huddersfield Giants, the Wakefield Trinity Wildcats (Heritage № 1149), and the Featherstone Rovers as a , or .

Background
Field was born in Bradford, West Yorkshire, England.

Career
Field joined Leeds from amateur club Dewsbury Moor in September 1993. He made his début in the 1995–96 season, and went on to make 28 appearances for the club. He was loaned to Huddersfield Giants in 1998, appearing 20 times during the Super League III season.

He spent the majority of his Super League career at Wakefield Trinity Wildcats, where he played for eight seasons before being released at the end of 2006.

He then joined Featherstone Rovers from 2007–2010 until he retired from rugby league.

Testimonial match
Field's benefit season/testimonial match at Featherstone Rovers, allocated by the Rugby Football League, took place during the 2010 season.

Outside of rugby league
Field has owned the personal training gym "5 Star Fitness" since 2004. He runs the gym chain with several other current and former professional sportsmen, including Chris Annakin, (rugby league player) and Kenny Milne (former footballer).

He married Tracy Rogerson In 2000. Their first child, Oliver, was born in 2002, and their second child, Amelia, was born 4 years later in 2006. Jamie now lives in Tadcaster with Tracy, Oliver and Amelia.

References

External links
Testimonial Website at jamiefield.org.uk
Halifax charge continues
Crusaders win boosts title hopes
Wildcats hit by Field loss
Wildcats' Field breaks his hand

1976 births
Living people
English rugby league players
Featherstone Rovers players
Huddersfield Giants players
Leeds Rhinos players
Rugby league locks
Rugby league players from Bradford
Rugby league props
Rugby league second-rows
Wakefield Trinity players